Sharur (Sumerian:𒊹𒃡 šar₂-ur₃), which means "smasher of thousands" is the weapon and symbol of the god Ninurta. Sumerian mythic sources describe it as an enchanted talking mace. It has been suggested as a possible precursor for similar objects in other mythology such as Arthurian lore.

Role and powers in mythology
Sharur plays a prominent role in an incident in which Ninurta is described as using it to defeat Asag, a monstrous demon; Sharur has the power to fly across vast distances without impediment and communicate with its wielder. 

This myth receives its most complete treatment in the epic Lugal-e, which in English is rendered as "The Exploits of Ninurta (O Warrior King)". According to this text, Sharur's role in the battle is not only as a weapon. It provides crucial intelligence to the hero, acting as an emissary between the god Enlil and Ninurta and relating to him the former's will, including a command to slay the architect Kur, a primeval serpent god venerated in Babylon, as well as a strategy to defeat Asag. Kur is associated with mountains and the primordial elements.

Powers
Apart from its aforementioned ability to fly and communicate with its wielder, Sharur may also take the form of a winged lion, a common motif in Sumerian and Akkadian lore.

See also
Asakku
Durandal
Excalibur
List of mythological weapons
Mjølnir
Vajra

References

Mesopotamian mythology
Sumer
KUR
Mythological weapons
Weaponry articles needing attention
Clubs (weapon)